Peter D. Francis (born 1934) is an American former politician in the state of Washington. He served in the Washington House of Representatives and Washington State Senate as a Democrat from the 32nd District. He was a member of the first Washington Redistricting Commission in 1983.

References

Living people
1934 births
Politicians from Seattle
Washington (state) lawyers
Democratic Party Washington (state) state senators
Democratic Party members of the Washington House of Representatives